Dionysios "Dennis" Christu (born 27 July 1989 Larissa) is a Greek-Czech footballer who plays as a striker for FK Fotbal Třinec. He played two league matches for Czech team Banik Ostrava in 2011.

References

External links

Official site 

1989 births
Living people
Czech footballers
Association football forwards
MŠK Žilina players
Slovak Super Liga players
Expatriate footballers in Slovakia
Czech expatriate sportspeople in Slovakia
Czech First League players
FC Baník Ostrava players
FK Fotbal Třinec players
Czech people of Greek descent
Footballers from Larissa